The 2015 Nicholls State Colonels football team represented Nicholls State University as a member of the Southland Conference during the 2015 NCAA Division I FCS football season. Led by first-year head coach Tim Rebowe, the Colonels compiled an overall record of 3–8 with a mark of 3–6 in conference play, placing in a three-way tie for eighth in the Southland. Nicholls State played home games at John L. Guidry Stadium in Thibodaux, Louisiana.

Previous season
Fifth-year head coach Charlie Stubbs resigned after the first three games. Steve Axman was named interim head coach and completed the 2014 season. The Colonels finished the season with a 0–12 overall record and were 0–8 in conference play.

On November 21, 2014, following the Colonels' season conclusion, Tim Rebowe was named the tenth head coach of the Nicholls State Colonels. Rebowe had been an assistant coach at University of Louisiana-Lafayette for eleven years as well as an assistant coach at Nicholls State for six years prior to that.

Schedule

Game summaries

@ Louisiana–Monroe

Sources:

@ Incarnate Word

Sources:

@ Colorado

Sources:

McNeese State

Sources:

@ Stephen F. Austin

Sources:

Houston Baptist

Sources:

@ Sam Houston State

Sources:

Northwestern State

Sources:

@ Lamar

Sources:

Central Arkansas

Sources:

@ Southeastern Louisiana

Sources:

References

Nicholls State
Nicholls Colonels football seasons
Nicholls State Colonels football